The Black Arrows, one of the predecessors to the current Royal Air Force Aerobatic Team the Red Arrows, were an aerobatic demonstration team formed in 1956 by Squadron Leader Roger L.Topp, then Commanding Officer 111 Squadron ("treble-one").  One of the many memorable feats accomplished by the Black Arrows was the execution of a world record loop of 22 Hawker Hunters in formation at the Society of British Aircraft Constructors' show at Farnborough in 1958. This was a world record for the greatest number of aircraft looped in formation, and remains unbroken to this day. After the loop the Black Arrows performed the world's first 16 aircraft barrel roll. Roger Topp handed over the lead of the Black Arrows to Squadron Leader Peter Latham in late 1958. Latham expanded the size of the team to nine aircraft from the original five and led the Squadron for two years.

No. 111 Squadron was formed at RAF North Weald where they received the Hunter before moving to RAF Wattisham in Suffolk. Until 1961, the Black Arrows were the RAF's premier team. In the early years of the 1960s the "Blue Diamonds" of No. 92 Squadron RAF (also flying Hunters), "The Tigers" of No. 74 Squadron RAF, equipped with the new English Electric Lightning, the "Red Pelicans" flying BAC Jet Provosts, and the "Yellowjacks" flying Folland Gnats formed. The large number of squadron display teams later rationalised to a single unit from the Central Flying School.

Aircraft used

List of Leaders

 1956–1958: Roger Topp
 1958–1960: Peter Latham

Notes and references

External links
Videos of the Black Arrows' last show, in Barcelona, accessed on 5 November 2022
 Royal Air Force website, accessed on 5 November 2022
 Royal Air Force website - see Red Arrows History, accessed on 5 November 2022
 Black Arrows history at RAF website through the Internet Archive

British aerobatic teams
Organisations based in Suffolk
Military units and formations in Suffolk
Royal Air Force units